The Watch Below (1966) is a  science fiction novel by British writer James White about a colony of humans stranded underwater in a sunken ship, who survive by air pockets, and a water-breathing alien species in search of a new home. The two generation ships encounter each other in the Earth's ocean.

Reception
Algis Budrys of Galaxy Science Fiction liked the novel, stating that it was the first generation ship story to expand on Robert Heinlein's Orphans of the Sky.

References

External links
 
 

1966 British novels
1966 science fiction novels
Novels by James White (author)
British science fiction novels
Ballantine Books books
20th-century Irish novels
Irish science fiction novels
Underwater civilizations in fiction
Novels about extraterrestrial life
Underwater novels